Chah Cheragh may refer to:

Chah Cheragh, Kerman
Chah Cheragh, Lorestan